The Braden Castle Park Historic District is a U.S. historic district (designated as such on May 9, 1983) located in Bradenton, Florida. The district is bounded by the Manatee and Braden Rivers, Ponce DeLeon Street, and Pelot Avenue. It contains 192 historic buildings and 3 structures.

The historic district contains ruins of the 1850 Braden House, a house of tabby owned by Joseph Braden.

References

External links

Bradenton, Florida
National Register of Historic Places in Manatee County, Florida
Historic districts on the National Register of Historic Places in Florida